Hexosamines are amino sugars created by adding an amine group to a hexose.

Examples include: 
 Fructosamine (based upon fructose)
 Galactosamine (based upon galactose)
 Glucosamine (based upon glucose)
 Mannosamine  (based upon mannose)

External links